Hayden Chisholm (born 27 May 1975) is a saxophonist and multi-instrumentalist from New Zealand. He performs jazz, improvised music, and contemporary classical music.

Life and career

Chisholm was raised in New Plymouth, New Zealand, by parents Heather and Doug Chisholm. His first musical experiences came with local Dixieland bands. He began playing clarinet at age nine before switching to what became his primary instrument, the alto saxophone, two years later. The early influences of Johnny Hodges, Sun Ra, Eric Dolphy were strong, being his first jazz records. He was a member of the award-winning New Plymouth Boys' High School Jazz band and won the prize for Most Outstanding Jazz Musician at the National Jazz Festival in Tauranga, 1991.

With a DAAD scholarship Chisholm attended the Musik Hochschule in Cologne, Germany. He studied saxophone with Frank Gratkowski. In 1997 he received the New Zealand Young Achievers Award which enabled him to continue his studies abroad. During these years he also studied Carnatic music in Chennai and travelled extensively in the Balkans learning the different musical traditions.

During his studies in Cologne Chisholm developed a system of micro-tonal fingerings for saxophone and so called "split-scales" which he presented on his 1996 debut solo CD Circe on Jazzhaus Musik. These scales split perfect intervals using quarter tones. His microtonal work was later featured on the Root70 album Root70 on 52nd 1/4 Street which received the German Critics Award.

During his studies in Cologne he met many musicians he still collaborates with today including Marcus Schmickler, Nils Wogram, John Taylor, Felix Fan, Adrian Brendel, Burnt Friedman, Jochen Rückert, Burnt Friedman, Antonis Anissegos, Jaki Liebezeit, Claudio Bohorquez. He also worked under Mauricio Kagel who was then professor for composition.

Since 2000 he has collaborated with the German artist Rebecca Horn. His work with her is wide-ranging, from composing the music for major site-specific installations "Moonmirror" (Mallorca, 2003), "Lumiere en Prison" (Paris, 2002), Spiriti de Madre Perla" (Naples, 2002), "Twilight Transit" (NYC 2004), Heart Shadows (Lisbon, 2005), "Das Universum in einer Perle" (Berlin, 2006), to recomposing the music for her early performance films which was released on a complete DVD set in 2005. In 2008 he worked as assistant director with Horn for the Salvatore Sciarrino Opera Luci mie traditrici at the Salzburger Festspiele. In 2009 he composed the music for her film Fata Morgana which was premiered at the Teatro La Fenice Opera House during the Venice Biannale. In 2011 he composed the music for her documentary film "Moonmirror Journey" which premiered in Berlin.

In 2001 he composed music for the German Theater (Deutsches Schauspielhaus) in Hamburg, working on Maria Stuart by Schiller and Arabische Nacht by Schimmelpfennig. In 2006 and 2007 he was musical director of the Earth Festival in Kenya which featured a large cast of international musicians, including Huun Huur Tu. In 2008 he performed with David Sylvian on the "World is Everything" tour. Since 2006 he teaches a yearly masterclass on Mount Pilion in Greece in the village of Agios Lavrentios. His course "The G-string of Pythagoras" fuses saxophone, just intonation, ancient music theory, and improvisation. In 2008 he was assistant director at the Salzburg Festspiele of the Opera "Luci Mie Traditrici" by Salvatore Sciarrino. In 2012 Chisholm was featured in the feature documentary Sound of Heimat – Deutschland singt directed by Arne Birkenstock and Jan Tengeler. In the film, Chisholm travels through Germany and explores authentic forms of German folk music. In 2013 he released a 13-CD Box set 13 Views of the Heart's Cargo which presents his most important recordings dating back to 2001. The first CD in this box, Love in Numbers, features works for saxophone in which Chisholm explores the Fibonacci series as it manifests in the overtone series.

In 2015 Hayden Chisholm contributed to Waywords and Meansigns, a collaborative project setting James Joyce's Finnegans Wake to music.

Hayden is a member of the quartet Root 70 with trombonist Nils Wogram. In 2018 Chisholm was a finalist at the New Zealand Jazz Awards in the Recorded Music NZ Best Jazz Artist category.

Discography

As leader/co-leader
 Circe (Jazzhaus Musik, 1996)
 Miniatures (2nd Floor, 1999)
 Subultra: NGC2997 with Jochen Bohnes (Subultra Edition, 2000)
 Master Fu's Relaxation Exercises (2002)
 Subultra: Subultra Live with Jochen Bohnes (Subultra Edition, 2003)
 Music for Rebecca Horn's Installations (Holzwarth Publications, 2005)
 Nearness (Holzwarth Publications, 2005)
 Doha: Music to Benefit the Great Stupa at Shambhala Mountain Center with Claudio Bohorquez and Gareth Lubbe (Padma Media, 2005)
 Amazing Daze with Marcus Schmickler (Haepna, 2006)
 The Embassadors : Healing the Music (Nonplace, 2007)
 The Embassadors: Coptic Dub (Nonplace, 2009)
 Breve (Pirouet, 2015)
Unwind
 Unwind: Unwind (Rattle, 2017)
 Unwind: Orange (Rattle, 2018)
 Unwind: Saffron (Rattle, 2020)
 Unwind: Daylight (Rattle, 2023)

13 Views of the Heart's Cargo (Moontower Foundation, 2013) (13-CD box set)
 Love in Numbers
 The Rabbit's Dream of the Inner Mongolia
 Nearness Live
 Lula Pena and Hayden Chisholm Live in Berlin
 Hayden plays Haydn
 Mute Density with the Lucern Jazz Orchestra
 Fragmented Teaching
 The Dharma Cowboy
 The Life of Hands in Love
 Breve - Live at Plush
 The Well-Tempered Sruti Box
 Auto-Poetica – Works for Saxophone
 My Blood Flows from Scotland to Armenia

Cusp of Oblivion (Moontower Foundation, 2016) (13-CD box set) 
 Cusp of Oblivion
 Sisyphus Runs
 The Void Between Us
 Finn Again Wakes
 Temptation
 Glowing Core
 Blowslap
 Cassiopeian Slowdance
 Ace of My Heart
 Transitioning Alpha Theta
 Sacred Love and Pain
 Oracle Hymns
 Star Shepherd

As sideman
With Bernd Friedmann
 Burnt Friedman & The Nu Dub Players: Can't Cool (Nonplace, 2003)
 Burnt Friedman & Jaki Liebezeit: Out in the Sticks with David Sylvian (Nonplace, 2005)
 Burnt Friedman & Jaki Liebezeit: Secret Rhythms 2 (Nonplace, 2005)
 Flanger: Spirituals (Nonplace, 2005)
 Burnt Friedman: First Night Forever (Nonplace, 2007)
 Burnt Friedman & Jaki Liebezeit: Secret Rhythms 3 (Nonplace, 2008)
 Flanger: Bibliotheque Pascal (Nonplace, 2010)
 Burnt Friedman & Jaki Liebezeit: Secret Rhythms 4 (Nonplace, 2012)
 Burnt Friedman: Bokoboko (Nonplace, 2012)

With Sebastian Gramss
 Slow Fox: The Wood (Jazzwerkstatt, 2014)
Slow Fox: Gentle Giants (Traumton, 2017)

With Nine Horses
 Money for All (Samadhi Sound, 2007)
 Snow Borne Sorrow with David Sylvian and Steve Jansen (Samadhi Sound, 2005)

With Pluramon
 Dreams Top Rock (Karaoke Kalk, 2003)
 The Monstrous Surplus (Karaoke Kalk, 2007)

With Dejan Terzic
 Melanoia (Enja, 2013)
 Red (BMC, 2016)
 Labyrinth (Enja, 2015)

With Nils Wogram's Root 70
 Root 70 (2nd Floor, 2000)
 Gettin' Rooted (Enja, 2004)
 Heaps Dub (Nonplace, 2005)
 Fahrvergnugen (Intuition, 2006)
 Root 70 on 52nd 1/4 St (Intuition, 2009)
 Listen to Your Woman (Nwog, 2011)
 Rio Mare (Nwog, 2013)
 Wise Men Can't Be Wrong (Nwog, 2015)
 Luxury Habits (Nwog, 2017)

With Zeitkratzer
 Cheap Imitation – Schonberg Pierrot Lunaire with Reinhold Friedl and Markus Weiser (Zeitkratzer, 2007)
 Volksmusik (Zeitkratzer, 2008)
 Electronics – Carsten Nicolai (Zeitkratzer, 2008)
 Electronics – Terre Thaemlitz (Zeitkratzer, 2008)
 Electronics – Keiki Haino (Zeitkratzer, 2008)
 Old School – Alvin Lucier (Zeitkratzer, 2010)
 Old School – James Tenney (Zeitkratzer, 2010)
 Old School – John Cage (Zeitkratzer, 2010)
 Plays Pres [Polish Radio Experimental Studio], (Bold, 2010)

With others
 Hans Ludemann RISM 7: FutuRISM (Jazz Haus Musik, 1998)
 Jochen Rueckert: Introduction (Jazzline, 1998)
 John Goldsby: Viewpoint (Nagel-Heyer, 2001)
 Nils Wogram Sextet: Odd and Awkward (Enja, 2001)
 Thorsten Wollmann/WDR Big Band Cologne: Colours of Siam (In & Out, 2002)
 Antonis Anissegos: Amoebas (Konnex, 2004)
 Dan Sperber Complex: I (2006)
 Coloma: Love's Recurring Dream (Italic, 2009) 
 Juergen Friedrich: Monosuite (Pirouet, 2012)
 P.O.P: Täbriz (Monotype Records, 2013)
 Norman Meehan: Small Holes in the Silence (Rattle, 2015)
 Nautilus: Infrablue (Two Rivers, 2016)
 Wout Gooris: Some Time (2016)
 Tilo Weber: Four Fauns (Mallet Muse, 2018)
Nils Wogram: Muse (NWog, 2021)

References

External links
 
 
 

1975 births
Living people
New Zealand musicians
People educated at New Plymouth Boys' High School
21st-century saxophonists
Experimental musicians
Free improvisation saxophonists
Jazz composers
Jazz alto saxophonists
Jazz fusion musicians
Jazz fusion saxophonists
Pirouet Records artists
Enja Records artists